Raúl Eduardo González Guzmán (born 28 June 1985 at Valencia, Venezuela), known as "El Pollo", is a Venezuelan footballer who plays for Cypriot side ASIL Lysi.

This right-footed player plays preferably as right winger, but his good defense means that he also can be used as right back. He is the youngest brother of Héctor González, also a known Venezuelan footballer.

Club career
He formed almost integrally in the Social Center Ítalo Venezuelan of the city of Valencia. He debuted with the first team of the Deportivo Italchacao in 2002, participating even in Copa Libertadores. In 2004 received the call to form part of the Youthful National Selection that would participate in the 22a, edition of the South American Championship Under-20 "Youth of America" Colombia 2005, where Venezuela advanced to the final round and occupied the sixth position. In 2005, became a part of the Aragua FC where is relegated almost completely during the six months to the banking, with very little participation. In January 2006 signed with the Caracas FC, one of the successful and largest teams of the country, where obtained its first championship in spite of not include the ownership to a large extent of the tournament. In January 2007 was yielded to the Portuguesea FC. That same year and product of its great action in the tournament closure becomes a part of the list of Venezuelan footballers abroad when receives an offering of Doxa Katokopia club recently promoted to the Cypriot First Division.  The player actually plays in Enosis Neon Paralimni FC also a team from the Cypriot First Division. In 2010 the player transfer to the Cup - Winners 2010 in Cyprus Apollon Limassol.

Ahead of the 2019/20 season, González joined ASIL Lysi.

References

External links
 Raúl González(2005), South American Championship Under-20 2005
 Raúl González(2008), Players in the Venezuelan Foreign
 Raúl González(2011), 

1985 births
Living people
Sportspeople from Valencia, Venezuela
Venezuelan footballers
Venezuela international footballers
Deportivo Italia players
Aragua FC players
Caracas FC players
P.O. Xylotymbou players
Ayia Napa FC players
Doxa Katokopias FC players
Enosis Neon Paralimni FC players
Apollon Limassol FC players
Anagennisi Deryneia FC players
Carabobo F.C. players
GKS Bełchatów players
ASIL Lysi players
Cypriot First Division players
Venezuelan expatriate footballers
Expatriate footballers in Cyprus
Expatriate footballers in Poland
Venezuelan expatriate sportspeople in Cyprus
Venezuelan expatriate sportspeople in Poland
Association football wingers
21st-century Venezuelan people